HD 222109 is a binary star system in the northern constellation of Andromeda. They have a combined apparent visual magnitude of 5.80, making them visible by the naked eye as a single star. They also have a combined spectral classification B8V. The pair is located at approximately 800 light years from Solar System, and orbit each other with a period of 351.22 years, a separation of 0.41, and an orbital eccentricity of 0.39. They have individual apparent magnitudes of 6.08 and 7.38, respectively.

References

External links
 Image HD 222109

Andromeda (constellation)
B-type main-sequence stars
Binary stars
Durchmusterung objects
222109
116582
8962